Märk hur vår skugga (Mark how our shadow) is one of the best-known of the 1790 Fredman's Epistles, where it is No. 81. These were written and performed by Carl Michael Bellman, the dominant figure in the Swedish song tradition. Its subject is the funeral of one of Bellman's female acquaintances, Grälmakar Löfberg's wife.

Context

Song

Music and verse form 

The song has four verses, each of 9 lines. The music is in  time, and is marked Andantino.> The melody may be by Bellman himself; a very similar melody was used by Eric Lorentz Zebell, but it was printed after the Epistles. The real Doctor Blad was the Bellman family's doctor, and one of their closest friends, during the latter part of Bellman's life.

Lyrics 

The song was written late in the 1780s or in 1790, not long before publication.
Epistle No. 81 is subtitled "Til Grälmakar Löfberg i Sterbhuset vid Danto bommen, diktad vid Grafven" (To Quarrelsome Löfberg in the Hospice by the Danto barrier, dictated at the Grave). The dedication runs "Dedicerad til Doctor BLAD" (Dedicated to Doctor Blad).

Reception 

The scholar of literature Lars Lönnroth writes that Bellman often begins with a priestly tone, as he does for this churchyard epistle, before turning from the elegiac to a drinking-orgy, as Fredman and the other guests are unmasked. The language, the genre, the voice, and the roles played all switch over, he observes, from the elevated to a drinking song's slapdash interaction. He writes that this does not mean that the sacred is accorded no value; rather, Bellman directs the "holy light" of attention from the high to the low, valuing both of them.

Students of Swedish literature at the University of Gothenburg are expected to study Fredman's Songs and Epistles, "especially Fredman's epistle nos. 23, 33, and 81."

Recordings and translations

Epistle 81 has been recorded by Fred Åkerström and by Cornelis Vreeswijk. Other versions have been recorded by Stefan Sundström and Imperiet, who scored a 1985-1985 Svensktoppen hit with the song. The English-speaking band Mediaeval Baebes recorded the song in Swedish on their 2005 album Mirabilis. The Swedish folk singer Sofia Karlsson included it in her 2007 album Visor från vinden, alongside works by poets such as Baudelaire and Dan Andersson; it was the only Bellman song in the collection. The Danish metal band Evil Masquerade included the song, in Swedish, in their 2016 album The Outcast Hall of Fame.

An English translation, entitled Epistle No. 81, has been recorded by the Swedish doom metal band Candlemass on the 1988 album Ancient Dreams, and by the American doom metal band While Heaven Wept on the 2003 album Of Empires Forlorn. Another English translation, entitled Castrum Doloris, was recorded by the Swedish black metal band Marduk on their 2003 album World Funeral. Vreeswijk translated the epistle to Dutch.

The Bellman biographer Paul Britten Austin made a verse translation in 1977.

Notes

References

Sources

 
 
 
  (contains the most popular Epistles and Songs, in Swedish, with sheet music)
  (with facsimiles of sheet music from first editions in 1790, 1791)

External links 

 Text of Epistle 81

1790 compositions
Swedish songs
Fredmans epistlar